Genkō (元弘) was a Japanese era name (年号, nengō, lit. year name) of the Southern Court during the Era of Northern and Southern Courts after Gentoku and before Kenmu.  This period spanned the years from August 1331 through January 1334. Reigning Emperors were Emperor Go-Daigo-Tennō (後醍醐天皇) in the south and Emperor Kōgon-Tennō (光厳天皇) in the north.

Events of the Genkō era
 1331–1333: The Genkō War (元弘の乱, Genkō no Ran) lasted the entire length of the era, which marked the fall of the Kamakura shogunate and led to the ultimately unsuccessful Kenmu Restoration.

Northern Court equivalents
Shōkei

See also
Mongol invasions of Japan

Notes

References
 Nussbaum, Louis-Frédéric and Käthe Roth. (2005).  Japan encyclopedia. Cambridge: Harvard University Press. ;  OCLC 58053128
 Titsingh, Isaac. (1834). Nihon Ōdai Ichiran; ou,  Annales des empereurs du Japon.  Paris: Royal Asiatic Society, Oriental Translation Fund of Great Britain and Ireland. OCLC 5850691
 Varley, H. Paul. (1980). A Chronicle of Gods and Sovereigns: Jinnō Shōtōki of Kitabatake Chikafusa. New York: Columbia University Press. ;  OCLC 6042764

External links
 National Diet Library, "The Japanese Calendar" -- historical overview plus illustrative images from library's collection

Japanese eras
1330s in Japan